Chaypareh-ye Bala Rural District is in Zanjanrud District of Zanjan County, Zanjan province, Iran. At the National Census of 2006, its population was 4,379 in 1,065 households. There were 4,162 inhabitants in 1,210 households at the following census of 2011. At the most recent census of 2016, the population of the rural district was 4,033 in 1,217 households. The largest of its nine villages was Qarah Buteh, with 2,594 people.

References 

Zanjan County

Rural Districts of Zanjan Province

Populated places in Zanjan Province

Populated places in Zanjan County